Laura Howes is an American scholar of Middle English literature. She is the author of Chaucer's Gardens and the Language of Convention (1998) and the editor, with Marie Borroff, of the Norton Critical Edition of Sir Gawain and the Green Knight (2010). Howes received her B.A. from Cornell University and her M.A. and Ph.D. from Columbia University, and is Professor of English at the University of Tennessee.

Publications

References

Living people
Cornell University alumni
Columbia University alumni
University of Tennessee faculty
Year of birth missing (living people)